Totally Pauly is an MTV television series starring Pauly Shore. The series largely consisted of Shore’s character interviewing celebrities, performing short comic bits, and introducing music videos. The show was broadcast intermittently on MTV between 1990-2003 with regular broadcasts occurring between 1990 and 1997, 1998-2001, & 2002-2003.

Critical reception
Entertainment Weekly gave the show a C+ rating, saying, "Tons o’ teens are tuning in to Pauly Shore, who, in the guise of a roving VJ, interrupts MTV's ceaseless flow of Skid Row and Van Halen videos to stroll through malls and converse in a modified San Fernando Valley-speak."

References

External links

1990 American television series debuts
2003 American television series endings
MTV original programming
1990s American comedy television series
English-language television shows